The 1988–89 snooker season was a series of snooker tournaments played between July 1988 and May 1989.  The following table outlines the results for the ranking and invitational events.


Calendar

Official rankings 

The top 16 of the world rankings, these players automatically played in the final rounds of the world ranking events and were invited for the Masters.

Notes

References

External links

1988
Season 1989
Season 1988